Day Dreams (also billed as Daydreams) is a 1922 American short comedy film directed by and featuring Buster Keaton. It is most famous for a scene where Keaton finds himself on the inside of a riverboat paddle wheel. It is a partially lost film and available from public domain sources.

Plot
Buster wants to marry a girl, but her father disapproves. Therefore Keaton vows he will go the city and get a job, or commit suicide. He takes several jobs (janitor, employee in an animal hospital, street cleaner, extra in a theatrical play,...) which all disastrously go wrong. In the final scenes he gets stuck inside a riverboat paddle wheel, where he has to run to get out of it. In the end he returns to his girlfriend's father, but since he failed in every way he is given a gun to shoot himself. Buster however manages to miss himself and is therefore kicked out the window by the girl's father.

Cast
 Buster Keaton as The Young Man
 Renée Adorée as The Girl 
 Edward F. Cline as The Theater Director (uncredited)
 Joe Keaton as The Girl's Father (uncredited)
 Joe Roberts as The Mayor (uncredited)

Production 
Filmed, in part, in San Francisco, Oakland,  and Los Angeles.

See also
 Buster Keaton filmography
 Day Dreams - Three Movie Buffs Review

References

External links

 Day Dreams at the International Buster Keaton Society

1922 films
1922 comedy films
1922 short films
Silent American comedy films
American silent short films
American black-and-white films
American comedy short films
Films directed by Buster Keaton
Films directed by Edward F. Cline
Films produced by Joseph M. Schenck
Films with screenplays by Buster Keaton
Films with screenplays by Roscoe Arbuckle
Articles containing video clips
Films shot in Los Angeles
Films shot in San Francisco
1920s American films